Ferdi Myumyunov (born 26 March 1992) is a Bulgarian professional footballer who plays as a goalkeeper for Hanauer SC 1960.

Club career

Early career
He was chosen as the best senior youth player of Lokomotiv Plovdiv in Bulgaria in 2010. He has been selected three time for the best goalkeeper of the week in Albania during the year 2015.

Levski Karlovo
On 10 January 2016 Myumyunov, after a great half season with Borislav Parvomay in the Bulgarian Third League, he signed with the Bulgarian Second League team Levski Karlovo.

References

External links

 http://plovdivderby.com/2017/03/12/levski-karlovo-otmakna-tochka-ot-tsska-sofiya-ii-ferdi-myumyunov-geroi-za-karlovtsi/

1992 births
Living people
Bulgarian footballers
Bulgarian expatriate footballers
Association football goalkeepers
Place of birth missing (living people)
KS Turbina Cërrik players
FC Levski Karlovo players
Neftochimic Burgas players
OFC Vihren Sandanski players
Kategoria e Parë players
People from Asenovgrad